Gabriela Teresa Lenartowicz (born 12 December 1960) is a Polish politician. She was elected to the Sejm (9th term) representing the constituency of Bielsko-Biała II. She previously also served in the 8th term of the Sejm (2015–2019).

References 

Living people
1960 births
Place of birth missing (living people)
21st-century Polish politicians
21st-century Polish women politicians
Members of the Polish Sejm 2015–2019
Members of the Polish Sejm 2019–2023
Women members of the Sejm of the Republic of Poland